Caunahue River is a river located in the Los Ríos Region of Chile.

References

Rivers of Los Ríos Region
Rivers of Chile